Clarisse Agathe Le Bihan (born 14 December 1994) is a French professional footballer who plays as a midfielder for NWSL club Angel City.

Career statistics

International

Scores and results list France's goal tally first. Score column indicates score after each Le Bihan goal.

Honours 
France U19
Winner
 UEFA Women's Under-19 Championship: 2013

References

External links 
 
 
 

1994 births
Living people
People from Quimperlé
Sportspeople from Finistère
Footballers from Brittany
Women's association football forwards
French women's footballers
France women's youth international footballers
France women's international footballers
Division 1 Féminine players
National Women's Soccer League players
Montpellier HSC (women) players
En Avant Guingamp (women) players
Angel City FC players
Universiade gold medalists for France
Universiade medalists in football
UEFA Women's Euro 2017 players
French expatriate women's footballers
Expatriate women's soccer players in the United States
French expatriate sportspeople in the United States